Marušiak (Slovak feminine: Marušiaková) and Marusiak are surnames which may refer to: 

 Juraj Marušiak (born 1970), Slovak political scientist
 Marek Marušiak (born 1990), Slovak ice hockey player
 Yevhen Marusiak (born 2000), Ukrainian ski jumper

See also
 

Slovak-language surnames
Ukrainian-language surnames